Beams is a psych-folk band formed in Toronto in 2012. The group have worked with noted producers John McEntire (Tortoise, Broken Social Scene, Yo La Tengo) and Grammy winner Peter J. Moore (Dylan & The Band, Neil Young, Joni Mitchell).

Notable media coverage has included continuous appearances in leading roots & Americana magazine No Depression, the Financial Times highlighting their cover of Kate Bush's Running Up That Hill, and regular appearances in Canadian music media including the CBC, Exclaim!, Now, Chart Attack, plus various local television programs, newspapers, and blogs.

Discography 
Studio Albums
2021 – Ego Death
2018 – Teach Me To Love
2013 – Just Rivers

Singles
 2021 Born to Win
 2019 Sweet Tea
 2018 You Are an Ocean
 2018 Berlin
 2017 I Wanted To Tell Her
 2015 Running Up That Hill
 2015 The Gutters & The Glass
 2013 Be My Brother / Glory Box

EPs
 2015 The Gutters & the Glass

References

External links 
 Official Site

Musical groups established in 2012
Musical groups from Toronto
2012 establishments in Ontario